Canarium kostermansii is a tree in the family Burseraceae. It is named for the Indonesian botanist André Kostermans.

Description
The bark is brown and smooth.

Distribution and habitat
Canarium kostermansii is endemic to Borneo. Its habitat is lowland and hill forests from sea-level to  altitude.

References

kostermansii
Endemic flora of Borneo
Trees of Borneo
Plants described in 1955